Wechsler (German: exchanger) may refer to:

Surname
 David Wechsler (1896–1981), Romanian-American psychologist
 Henry Wechsler (1931/32–2021), Polish-American researcher
 Herbert Wechsler (1909–2000), American legal scholar
 James Wechsler (1915–1983), American journalist
 Nick Wechsler (actor) (born 1978), American actor
 Nick Wechsler (film producer), American film producer
 Benjamin Fondane (born Benjamin Wechsler or Wexler; 1898–1944), Romanian and French writer

Other
 Wechsler School, a historic school in Meridian, Mississippi

See also 
 
 Wexler (disambiguation)

German words and phrases
German-language surnames
Jewish surnames
Occupational surnames